Sonopresse is a French record label and distribution company founded in 1958. It was acquired by EMI in 1977. The label released records for Electric Light Orchestra and Kate Bush in France. Sonopresse reported $11 million in sales and 15% of the French record distribution market in 1971.

References 

 "Sonopresse". Showcase. August 20, 2008. Retrieved March 3, 2010.
 "Sonopresse Eyes Japan & U.S. As Export Marts". Billboard 64. August 9, 1975. Archive copy at Google books retrieved March 3, 2010.

External links 
 Rare Record Labels - Vinyl Record Collector's Information Guide
 Sonopresse - Encyclopédisque (French)
 
 
 All SONOPRESSE's LPs, EPs, CDs are on groovecollector.com
 Second Hand Songs - Label: Sonopresse
 Recherche : « Sonopresse » - B&M (French)
 Search records - buy and sell lps singles at Vinyl-Collector.com

French record labels